Color volume is the set of all available color at all available hue, saturation and brightness. It's the result of a 2D color space or 2D color gamut (that represent chromaticity) combined with the dynamic range.

The term has been used to describe HDR's higher color volume than SDR (i.e. peak brightness of at least 1,000 cd/m2 higher than SDR's 100 cd/m2 limit and wider color gamut than Rec. 709 / sRGB).

References 

Color
Chromaticism